Leptuca subcylindrica, commonly known as the Laguna Madre fiddler crab or the puffed fiddler crab, is a sparsely-studied species of fiddler crab native to southern Texas and northeastern Mexico in the Gulf of Mexico.

Before 2016, the species was known as Uca subcylindrica. In 2016, the subgenus Leptuca was promoted to the genus level.

Description
The carapace is tan to light orange in color and can be up to 25mm wide. The species epithet is derived from its cylindrical carapace. The male lacks a tuberculate ridge on the palm of the major cheliped. Its gonopod is unlike other fiddlers crab in that the distal part of the inner process is divided and appears fringed.

Habitat
The species lives in fresh to brackish water. Some habitats include mud flats, algal beds, rivers and creeks.

References

Ocypodoidea
Crustaceans described in 1900